Wilhelm Ludwig Franz Hallwachs (9 July 1859 – 20 June 1922) was a German physicist.

Life and career

Early years

Hallwachs was born in 1859 in Darmstadt to Ludwig and Emilie Hallwachs. His father was a high ranking public official (Geheimer Staatsrat) with the Ministry of the Interior and Justice of the Grand Duchy of Hesse, then part of the German Confederation.

Career

From 1878 Hallwachs studied physics, most of his time at the University of Strasbourg, then part of Germany he also did one year at the University of Berlin. At last he was an assistant to August Kundt at Strasbourg where he was awarded a doctorate in 1893.

Hallwachs moved on to become an assistant to Friedrich Kohlrausch at the University of Würzburg where he stayed there from 1884 until 1886. In 1886, he went to Leipzig where he habilitated with Gustav Heinrich Wiedemann until 1888. After that he followed Friedrich Kohlrausch in Strasbourg.

Hallwachs became a professor at the Dresden University of Technology in 1893, originally for electrical engineering until he succeeded August Toepler in 1900 as a professor for physics. In 1921/22 Hallwachs was rector of the university.

Private life

In 1890 Hallwachs married Marie Kohlrausch, the daughter of Professor Friedrich Kohlrausch (physicist); he was an assistant with her in Würzburg.

Scientific work
Hallwachs was a known as a builder of scientific instruments. Among the devices he invented are the electrometer quadrant and a double refractometer of great precision. Hallwachs was an assistant of Heinrich Hertz, in 1886, before the photoelectric effect was discovered. Hallwachs and Hertz, in 1887, carried on the investigations of electromagnetic waves. In 1888 Hallwachs formulated the hypothesis that a conductive plate on which to focus ultraviolet light carries a positive charge because the electrons are gouged out. This happened with more intensity in selenium. The phenomenon was seen in the same year by A. Righi. The phenomenon was called 'Hallwachs-Effekt', now called the photoelectric effect. The investigation of the photoelectric effect laid the foundation for the development of the photoelectric cell, photo electricity and Albert Einstein's quantum light hypothesis.

Works
 The light electricity. In: manual of Radiology, Volume 3, Leipzig 1916, pp. 245–563.

See also
Timeline of solar cells

References

20th-century German physicists
Scientists from Hesse
1922 deaths
1859 births
19th-century German physicists
Academic staff of TU Dresden